This is a list of films produced by the Indian Hindi-language film industry, popularly known Bollywood, based in Mumbai ordered by year and decade of release. Although "Bollywood" films are generally listed under the Hindi language, most are in Hindustani and many in Urdu as well as Hindi, with partial Bhojpuri, Punjabi and occasionally other languages. Bollywood films can achieve national distribution across at least 22 of India's 29 states.

Speakers of Hindi, Bhojpuri, Urdu, and Punjabi understand the mixed language usage of Bollywood thus extending the viewership to people all over the Indian subcontinent (throughout India and its neighboring countries). Here are some examples - partly Bhojpuri: PK, Panchlait, Manjhi – The Mountain Man and Jabariya Jodi; partly English: Kal Ho Naa Ho, Kabhi Alvida Naa Kehna, Dhoom 2, Partner, Om Shanti Om, Kismat Konnection, Kambakkht Ishq and Love Aaj Kal; partly Urdu: Fanaa, Saawariya, Jodhaa Akbar and Kurbaan; partly Punjabi: Jab We Met, Singh Is Kinng, Rab Ne Bana Di Jodi, Love Aaj Kal, Dil Bole Hadippa!, Band Baaja Baaraat, Patiala House, Phillauri and Thande Koyle. Veer-Zaara and Mausam is an equal mix of Urdu, Punjabi and a little bit of Hindi.

2020s
List of Hindi films of 2024
List of Hindi films of 2023  
List of Hindi films of 2022
List of Hindi films of 2021
List of Hindi films of 2020

2010s
List of Hindi films of 2019
List of Hindi films of 2018
List of Hindi films of 2017
List of Hindi films of 2016
List of Hindi films of 2015
List of Hindi films of 2014
List of Hindi films of 2013
List of Hindi films of 2012
List of Hindi films of 2011
List of Hindi films of 2010

2000s

List of Hindi films of 2009
List of Hindi films of 2008
List of Hindi films of 2007
List of Hindi films of 2006
List of Hindi films of 2005
List of Hindi films of 2004
List of Hindi films of 2003
List of Hindi films of 2002
List of Hindi films of 2001
List of Hindi films of 2000

1990s
List of Hindi films of 1999
List of Hindi films of 1998
List of Hindi films of 1997
List of Hindi films of 1996
List of Hindi films of 1995
List of Hindi films of 1994
List of Hindi films of 1993
List of Hindi films of 1992
List of Hindi films of 1991
List of Hindi films of 1990

1980s

List of Hindi films of 1989
List of Hindi films of 1988
List of Hindi films of 1987
List of Hindi films of 1986
List of Hindi films of 1985
List of Hindi films of 1984
List of Hindi films of 1983
List of Hindi films of 1982
List of Hindi films of 1981	
List of Hindi films of 1980

1970s

List of Hindi films of 1979
List of Hindi films of 1978
List of Hindi films of 1977
List of Hindi films of 1976
List of Hindi films of 1975
List of Hindi films of 1974
List of Hindi films of 1973
List of Hindi films of 1972
List of Hindi films of 1971
List of Hindi films of 1970

1960s
List of Hindi films of 1969
List of Hindi films of 1968
List of Hindi films of 1967
List of Hindi films of 1966
List of Hindi films of 1965
List of Hindi films of 1964
List of Hindi films of 1963
List of Hindi films of 1962
List of Hindi films of 1961
List of Hindi films of 1960

1950s

List of Hindi films of 1959
List of Hindi films of 1958
List of Hindi films of 1957
List of Hindi films of 1956
List of Hindi films of 1955
List of Hindi films of 1954
List of Hindi films of 1953
List of Hindi films of 1952
List of Hindi films of 1951
List of Hindi films of 1950

1940s 

List of Hindi films of 1949
List of Hindi films of 1948
List of Hindi films of 1947
List of Hindi films of 1946
List of Hindi films of 1945
List of Hindi films of 1944
List of Hindi films of 1943
List of Hindi films of 1942
List of Hindi films of 1941
List of Hindi films of 1940

1930s
List of Hindi films of 1939
List of Hindi films of 1938
List of Hindi films of 1937
List of Hindi films of 1936
List of Hindi films of 1935
List of Hindi films of 1934
List of Hindi films of 1933
List of Hindi films of 1932
List of Hindi films of 1931
List of Hindi films of 1930

1920s
List of Hindi films of 1929
List of Hindi films of 1928
List of Hindi films of 1927
List of Hindi films of 1926
List of Hindi films of 1925
List of Hindi films of 1924
List of Hindi films of 1923
List of Hindi films of 1922
List of Hindi films of 1921
List of Hindi films of 1920

See also
 Indian cinema
 List of highest-grossing Indian films
 List of highest-grossing Hindi films
 Bibliography of Hindi cinema

References

 
Lists of musicals